DG Flugzeugbau GmbH is a manufacturer of sailplanes and other composite parts based in Bruchsal near Karlsruhe, Germany.

History
The business was founded in 1973 by Gerhard Glaser and Wilhelm Dirks as Glaser-Dirks Flugzeugbau GmbH.

In 2018 the company received an order to build "a large number" of the Volocopter 2X design under contract to Volocopter.

Aircraft

No longer in production
The Glaser-Dirks company produced the following gliders:
 DG-100 (Standard Class)
 DG-200 (15 metre Class)
 DG-300 (Standard Class)
 DG-400 (Self-launching motor glider)
 DG-500 (Two seater)
 DG-600 (15 metre and 18 meter Class)
 LS10 (15 metre and 18 metre Class)

Current gliders in production
DG Flugzeugbau currently produces:
 DG-808C (15 metre and 18 metre)
 DG-1001 (Two seater)
 Rolladen-Schneider LS8c-neo, (Standard Class with optional wing-tips to increase the span to 18 metres.)

References

External links

Aircraft manufacturers of Germany
Companies based in Baden-Württemberg
Manufacturing companies established in 1973
German brands
Glider manufacturers
 
1973 establishments in West Germany
German companies established in 1973